Chah Gaz may refer to:
 Chah Gaz, Fars
 Chah Gaz, Hormozgan
 Chah Gaz, Kerman
 Chah Gaz, Yazd